Henry Burns may refer to:

Politicians
Henry D. Burns, Mayor of Meridian, Mississippi
Henry Lee Burns, Louisiana politician; see List of United States political families (B)

Others
Henry Burns (doctor)
Henry Burns, character in Harry's Girls

See also
Harry Burns (disambiguation)

Henry Byrne (disambiguation)